Wat Phra Phutthabat is a Buddhist temple in Saraburi, Thailand. Its name means "temple of Buddha's footprint", because it contains a natural depression believed to be a footprint of the Lord Buddha.

History

Phra Phutthabat temple was built in 1624 (B.E. 2168) by King Songtham of Ayutthaya, after a hunter named Pram Bun found a large depression in the stone, resembling a huge footprint, near Suwan Banpot Hill or Satchaphanthakhiri Hill. The hunter reported his find to the king, who ordered workers to build a temporary mondop to cover the footprint; this later became the  temple.

Belief
The Bunnoowaat sutra tells of the flight of the Buddha to the peak of Mount Suwanbanphot, and of how he left his footprints. It is believed there are five footprints of the Buddha in different places including Phra Phutthabat temple. Some believe that worshiping the footprints, sprinkling water, or placing gold leaf on them will lead to the forgiveness of sin, success in life, or eternal happiness.

Geography
Phra Phutthabat temple is built in the mountains, mostly surrounded by forest. It is in Phra Phutthabat District, 28 kilometres from Saraburi City.

Festival
There are two main festivals held each year at Phra Phutthabat temple:
Holy Footprint festival - The Holy Footprint festival is held at the temple twice a year, usually in February and March. During this festival many Buddhist worshippers and tourists visit the temple to worship the Buddha’s footprint and participate in activities at the temple entrance.
Tak Bat Dok Mai Ceremony - Tak Bat Dok Mai Ceremony is considered as a main tradition function in Phra Phutthabat district. It is held at the start of the annual three-month Buddhist Lent. During the ceremony, people give alms to monks, and offer candles for the Buddhist Lent to Phra Phutthabat temple. Finally, they offer white or yellow flowers to the monks in the late evening.

Sacred Footprint
The size of the footprint is about 53 cm (21 inches) wide, 152 cm (five feet) long, and 28 cm (11 inches) deep. The footprint is covered by a decorated golden case. Inside the case the footprint is covered with layers of gold leaf, coins and banknotes thrown by worshipers and visitors.

References

Buddhist temples in Saraburi Province
Thai Theravada Buddhist temples and monasteries
17th-century Buddhist temples